In nuclear physics, hyperdeformation is theoretically predicted states of an atomic nucleus with extremely elongated shape and very high angular momentum. Less elongated states, superdeformation, have been well observed, but the experimental evidence for hyperdeformation is more limited. Hyperdeformed states correspond to an axis ratio of 3:1. They would be caused by a third minimum in the potential energy surface, the second causing superdeformation and the first minimum being normal deformation. Hyperdeformation is predicted to be found in 107Cd.

References

Nuclear physics